Ferdinand Boyer (12 October 1823, Nîmes - 26 July 1885) was a French Legitimist politician. He was a member of the National Assembly from 1871 to 1876 and a member of the Chamber of Deputies from 1876 to 1885.
Artwork-1971-Le monde des arts en Italie et la France de la Révolution et de l’Empire

References

1823 births
1885 deaths
People from Nîmes
Politicians from Occitania (administrative region)
Legitimists
Members of the National Assembly (1871)
Members of the 1st Chamber of Deputies of the French Third Republic
Members of the 2nd Chamber of Deputies of the French Third Republic
Members of the 3rd Chamber of Deputies of the French Third Republic